Little Secret is the third studio album by Canadian singer Nikki Yanofsky. It was released on October 7, 2014.  The album charted at number 13 on Billboards Top Jazz Albums chart, and the single "Necessary Evil" reached number 52 on the Canadian Hot 100.

Track listing

Charts

References 

2014 albums
Nikki Yanofsky albums